"Flag Salute" is a poem written by Esther Popel about the lynching of George Armwood on October 18, 1933 in Princess Anne, Maryland.   It was first published in August 1934 in The Crisis and later republished in its entirety on the cover of The Crisis in 1940.

It juxtaposes the murder of Armwood with quotations from the Pledge of Allegiance.
The poem reflects that lynching in the United States had become a "ritual of interracial social control."

Flag Salute

“I pledge allegiance to the flag”––

They dragged him naked

Through the muddy streets,

A feeble-minded black boy!

And the charge? Supposed assault

Upon an aged woman!

“Of the United States of America”—

One mile the dragged him

Like a sack of meal,

A rope around his neck, 

A bloody ear

Left dangling by the patriotic hand

Of Nordic youth! (A boy of seventeen!)

“And to the Republic for which it stands”—

And then they hanged his body to a tree,

Below the window of the county judge

Those pleadings for that battered human flesh

Were stifled by the brutish, raucous howls

Of men, and boys, and women with their babes,

Brought out to see the bloody spectacle

Of murder in the style of ‘33!

(Three thousand strong, they were!)

“one Nation, Indivisible”—

To make the tale complete

They built a fire—

What matters that the stuff they burned

Was flesh—and bone—and hair—

And reeking gasoline!

“With Liberty—and Justice”—

They cut the rope in bits

And passed them out,

For souvenirs, among the men and boys!

The teeth no doubt, on golden chains

Will hang

About the favored necks of sweethearts, wives,

And daughters, mothers, sisters, babies, too!

“For ALL!”

—Esther Popel

References

Harlem Renaissance
Racially motivated violence against African Americans
1934 poems
Poems about death
Historical poems
Lynching in the United States